"Ganja Burn" is a song recorded by Trinidadian-American rapper Nicki Minaj for her fourth studio album, Queen (2018). It was written by Minaj, Jairus Mozee, and Jeremy Reid; while its production was done by the latter. "Ganja Burn" is a reggae-inspired reggae fusion song, that lyrically finds Minaj defending her position in the music industry, while sending a message to other female rappers. To promote it, an accompanying music video for the song directed by Mert and Marcus was released on August 13.

Background and release
On August 10, 2018, Minaj revealed the final tracklist for her fourth studio album, Queen, that included an opening track titled "Ganja Burn". It premiered a few hours later as part of the album on all major music platforms. To promote it, as well as the 18 other tracks from the album, Minaj played the song live on her Beats 1 Queen Radio show with Zane Lowe, and explained the song's meaning. The song was originally intended to be titled "Ganja Burn", however when submitting the track listing, Minaj accidentally wrote "Burns" instead. It has since been fixed on iTunes and Spotify. Some lyrics quoted from the track were printed on the Queen merchandise.

Composition and lyrics
"Ganja Burn" is a reggae-inspired island-pop song. It uses a mid-tempo beat, that was described by The Atlantic as "evoking a beach party ruined by a cold snap." Minaj's recording engineer Big Juice explained the making process of the song saying, "[Minaj] probably freestyled 65%, 75% of the song. She got the beat from her producer J. Reid, head it, told me to load it up and ran in the booth. It was kind of the same with "Chun-Li". She was playing around, singing, “Ganja burn, ganja burn, ganja burn,” and then when she listened back, she was like, "that shit's hard!" I wanna say the hook is still the freestyle she laid when she first stepped in the booth. She pulled that shit out of thin air."

Lyrically, Minaj uses word play to defend her position in the music industry, "You made one dope beat, now you Kanye?/You got a nigga named Jay, now you 'Yoncé?/You got about three stacks, now you André?/...You gotta have real skill, gotta work for that," while sending a message about other female rappers in the music industry. The song has a simple chorus where Minaj sings about missing an ex, "Every  time I get high, I just think about you," and croons, "Ganja burn, ganja burn, ganja burn.” She tweeted soon after the song's release about her dissatisfaction with it, "[I] realized that I hate how low I made the hook," and revealed that she wanted to swap it out.

Critical reception
In The Hollywood Reporter, Jonny Coleman found that "Ganja Burns" was an arbitrary choice for the album, writing "[...] most of the sequencing seems arbitrary here, as if changes were being made up until the last minute and with little actual regard for flow." He concluded that the song was just "[a] filler which could have easily hit the cutting room floor." The Atlantics Spencer Kornhaber, expressed his insatisfaction with the verses-chorus matching, asking "[...] what do the verses have to do with the chorus? Why doesn’t the promising arrangement evolve over nearly five minutes? What’s the point, really? All that you really take away is status anxiety." In a positive review, Shamika Sanders of Billboard, praised Minaj's use of word play on the song, writing "At first listen, it sounds like Nicki references Cardi B's rap moniker Bardi when she drops the line 'bury the Barbie,' but that's what's so clever about Nicki's wordplay is her delivery, which is essential to every punch line."

Music video
An accompanying music video for the song premiered on August 13, 2018. It was directed by Turkish-Welsh duo Mert and Marcus, composed of Mert Alaş and Marcus Piggott, who previously directed Minaj's video for "Regret in Your Tears" (2017). The video matches the theme of the album cover art, which was also designed by Mert and Marcus. The music video was leaked a few hours before the album release, on August 10, 2018.

Credits and personnel
Credits and personnel adapted from Queen album liner notes.

Recording
 Recorded at Glenwood Place Studios, Burbank, California
 Mixed at Larrabee Sound Studios, North Hollywood, California
 Mastered at Chris Athen Masters, Austin, Texas

Personnel
 Nicki Minaj – vocals
 J. Reid – production
 Aubry "Big Juice" Delaine – record engineering
 Labrinth – record engineering
 Laura Bates – record engineering assistance
 Iván Jiménez – record engineering assistance
 Brian Judd – record engineering assistance
 Nick Valentin – record engineering assistance
 Jaycen Joshua – mixing
 David Nakaji – mixing assistance
 Ben Milchev – mixing assistance
 Jairus Mozee – guitars
 Chris Athens – mastering

Charts

References

2018 songs
Diss tracks
Nicki Minaj songs
Reggae fusion songs
Songs about cannabis
Songs about music
Songs written by Nicki Minaj